W. R. Byron Airport  is a privately owned, private use airport in Riverside County, California, United States. It is located four nautical miles (5 mi, 7 km) northwest of the central business district of Blythe, California, within the city limits.

Facilities
W. R. Byron Airport has one runway designated 18/36 with an asphalt surface measuring 2,640 by 660 feet (805 x 201 m).

History
The airfield opened on June 29, 1942. Known as Blythe Field and Gary Field, it began training United States Army Air Forces flying cadets under contract to Morton Air Academy. It was assigned to United States Army Air Forces West Coast Training Center (later Western Flying Training Command) as a primary (level 1) pilot training airfield. It had three 2,100' active hard-surfaced runways and three local auxiliary airfields for emergency and overflow landings. Flying training was performed with Ryan PT-22 as the primary trainer; it also had several PT-17 Stearmans assigned.

Known sub-bases and auxiliaries assigned to the field were:

 Ripley Auxiliary Field #1
 Ripley Auxiliary Field #2

It was inactivated on August 4, 1944 with the drawdown of AAFTC's pilot training program, then declared surplus and turned over to the Army Corps of Engineers on September 30, 1945. It was eventually discharged to the War Assets Administration (WAA), and the facilities of the former airport were reused by Palo Verde Community College. The college opened at the site on September 15, 1947, and at this point any aviation use of the airfield presumably ended.

Palo Verde College opened its doors as a junior college with an initial enrollment of seventeen students. By 1950, enrollment had reached 250. In September 1958, the college moved to East Hobsonway and closed its facilities at the former airport.

The site of Gary Field was reused as a private airfield beginning in 1981 as W. R. Byron Airport, and is a privately owned airfield.

Today, many buildings remain standing. In particular, the characteristic irregular arrangement of the barracks buildings which remains at the site make the location of Gary Field very much recognizable.

One of the large arch-roof hangars was destroyed by a fire on December 26, 2018. Before that, the second large hangar (at the northwest corner of the site) was apparently removed, but its foundation is still clearly recognizable.

An interesting sidebar to history puts billionaire Kirk Kerkorian at Morton Air Academy as a flight instructor during the early World War II period flying throughout the California desert; he made a first career flying charters, and later building hotels like the MGM Grand years later.

See also

 California World War II Army Airfields
 36th Flying Training Wing (World War II)
 Blythe Airport
 Desert Center Airport

References

Other sources
 
 Manning, Thomas A. (2005), History of Air Education and Training Command, 1942–2002.  Office of History and Research, Headquarters, AETC, Randolph AFB, Texas 
 Shaw, Frederick J. (2004), Locating Air Force Base Sites, History’s Legacy, Air Force History and Museums Program, United States Air Force, Washington DC. 
 Gary Field at Abandoned & Little-Known Airfields

External links

 Aerial image as of May 2002 from USGS The National Map

1942 establishments in California
Airports in Riverside County, California
Blythe, California
Airports established in 1942
Airfields of the United States Army Air Forces in California
Military facilities in the Mojave Desert
Military in Riverside County, California
USAAF Contract Flying School Airfields
World War II airfields in the United States
USAAF Western Flying Training Command
American Theater of World War II